P. V. Dixit was the Chief Justice of the Madhya Pradesh High Court from 1959 to 1969. He was also the acting Governor of Madhya Pradesh in February 1966.

See also
 List of Governors of Madhya Pradesh

References 

20th-century Indian judges
Governors of Madhya Pradesh
Judges of the Madhya Pradesh High Court
Year of birth missing
Possibly living people